Øymarksjøen is a lake in the municipalities of Aremark and Marker in Østfold county, Norway.

See also
List of lakes in Norway

Aremark
Marker, Norway
Lakes of Viken (county)